Orăștioara may refer to two places in Hunedoara County, Romania:

Orăștioara de Sus, a commune
Orăștioara de Jos, a village in Beriu Commune